Lady in a Jam is a 1942 film comedy directed by Gregory La Cava and starring Irene Dunne, Patric Knowles, Ralph Bellamy, and Eugene Pallette. It was made and distributed by Universal Pictures. The film's sets were designed by the art director Jack Otterson.

The film's alternate title is The Sheltered Side. A copy is preserved in the Library of Congress collection.

Plot
Jane Palmer's reckless spending and behavior concern her guardian Billingsley so much that he goes to a New York City clinic to seek psychiatric help for her. Dr. Enright, taking the case, sees how Jane refuses to even acknowledge that she has squandered her entire inheritance, and that her remaining possessions are being auctioned off.

Enright believes they need to trace the root of her problems, and accompanies Jane on a cross-country trip to her Arizona childhood home. "Cactus" Kate, her grandmother, is leery of Jane being in need of money, while childhood sweetheart Stanley Gardner deludes himself into thinking Jane has returned home just for him.

Jane begins prospecting for gold at her grandfather's mine. Seeing her growing romantic interest in the doctor, Stanley foolishly challenges him to an old-fashioned duel of pistols until he discovers Enright is a crack shot. Cactus Kate plants precious ore so that Jane can find it, inadvertently causing a gold rush by prospectors galore. Enright's seen enough craziness, and returns home, but Jane tracks him back to New York and declares that they were meant for each other.

Cast
 Irene Dunne as Jane Palmer
 Ralph Bellamy as Stanley
 Patric Knowles as Dr. Enright
 Eugene Pallette as Billingsley
 Samuel S. Hinds as Dr. Brewster
 Queenie Vassar as Cactus Kate
 Jane Garland as Strawberry
 Edward McWade as Ground-Hog
 Robert Homans as Faro Bill
 Russell Hicks as Carter
 Hardie Albright as Milton
 Isabel La Mal as Josephine
 Edward Gargan as Deputy
 Mona Barrie as Woman
 Irving Bacon as Motel Proprietor

References

External links
 Lady in a Jam in the Internet Movie Database

1942 films
American black-and-white films
1942 romantic comedy films
Films directed by Gregory La Cava
American romantic comedy films
Films scored by Frank Skinner
Universal Pictures films
Films set in Arizona
1940s English-language films
1940s American films